Gefen Publishing House (הוצאת גפן) is an English language  publishing firm located in Jerusalem, which also has a department in New York City.

History
Gefen was founded in 1981 by Murray and Hana Greenfield.

Its CEO is Ilan Greenfield, son of the founders.

The firm publishes approximately 40 titles per year. It specializes in English-language books of Jewish and Israeli interest.  Their publications cover a wide variety of Israeli and Jewish subjects.

References

External links
 Gefen Publishing - official website

Book publishing companies of Israel
Mass media in Jerusalem
Jewish printing and publishing
Publishing companies established in 1981